McKeever is a hamlet located in the Town of Webb in Herkimer County, New York, United States. The Moose River flows west through the hamlet.

References

Hamlets in Herkimer County, New York
Hamlets in New York (state)